The 2021 Fordham Rams baseball team represented Fordham University during the 2021 NCAA Division I baseball season. It was the program's 162nd season of existence, and their 27th season playing in the Atlantic 10 Conference. General manager, Kevin Leighton will assumed managerial duties for the 11th season.

Fordham entered 2021 as the defending Atlantic 10 Tournament champions, but failed to qualify for the tournament. Fordham finished the season 24–19, 11–9 in Atlantic 10 play.

Preseason

Coaches Poll 
The Atlantic 10 baseball coaches' poll was released on February 18, 2021. Fordham was picked to finish second in the Atlantic 10 regular season.

Roster

Schedule

Schedule Source:
*Rankings are based on the team's current ranking in the D1Baseball poll.

Rankings

References 

Fordham
Fordham Rams baseball seasons
Fordham Rams baseball